Jujiroa is a genus of ground beetles in the family Carabidae. There are more than 30 described species in Jujiroa, found in eastern Asia.

Species
These 36 species belong to the genus Jujiroa:

 Jujiroa alticola Ueno & Saito, 1991  (Taiwan and temperate Asia)
 Jujiroa ana (Ueno, 1955)  (Japan)
 Jujiroa anoides Sasakawa, 2006  (Japan)
 Jujiroa clarkei Deuve, 2004  (China)
 Jujiroa dandosana Sasakawa, 2006  (Japan)
 Jujiroa deharvengi Deuve, 2004  (Vietnam)
 Jujiroa deliciola Ueno & Kishimoto, 2001  (China)
 Jujiroa dracocephala Sasakawa, 2006  (Japan)
 Jujiroa elongata Ueno, 1955  (Japan)
 Jujiroa estriata Sasakawa, 2006  (Japan)
 Jujiroa fujisana Sasakawa, 2006  (Japan)
 Jujiroa ikezakii Nakane, 1989  (Japan)
 Jujiroa imunada Ueno, 1993  (Japan)
 Jujiroa inexpectata Tian & Fang, 2020  (China)
 Jujiroa iolandae Vigna Taglianti, 1995  (China)
 Jujiroa lingguanensis Deuve & Pütz, 2013  (China)
 Jujiroa longa Ueno & Saito, 1991  (Taiwan and temperate Asia)
 Jujiroa minobusana (Habu, 1978)  (Japan)
 Jujiroa montana (Morita, 2012)  (Japan)
 Jujiroa nipponica (Habu, 1950)  (Japan)
 Jujiroa nishikawai Ueno & Saito, 1991  (Taiwan and temperate Asia)
 Jujiroa ohkawai (Morita, 2012)  (Japan)
 Jujiroa onoi Takakura, 1987  (Japan)
 Jujiroa orthogenys Ueno & Saito, 1991  (Taiwan and temperate Asia)
 Jujiroa parvicollis Ueno & Saito, 1991  (Taiwan and temperate Asia)
 Jujiroa rainerschnelli Lassalle, 2010  (Vietnam)
 Jujiroa rectangulata Ueno & Saito, 1991  (Taiwan and temperate Asia)
 Jujiroa rufescens (Jedlicka, 1961)  (China)
 Jujiroa satoi Ueno, 2007  (China)
 Jujiroa shihi Ueno & Saito, 1991  (Taiwan and temperate Asia)
 Jujiroa suensoni Kirschenhofer, 1990  (China)
 Jujiroa toshioi (Habu, 1981)  (Japan)
 Jujiroa troglodytes Ueno, 1955  (Japan)
 Jujiroa uenoi Tian & He, 2020  (China)
 Jujiroa wangzheni Tian & He, 2020  (China)
 Jujiroa zhouchaoi Tian & He, 2020  (China)

References

Platyninae